Bumps is a one-off British sitcom created and written by Lucy Montgomery and Rhys Thomas for the BBC, which was broadcast on 21 February 2020. The sitcom follows a sixty-two year old woman who tries, and succeeds, in getting pregnant, and stars Amanda Redman, Lisa McGrillis, Seb Cardinal and Philip Jackson.

Storyline
Set in Frinton-on-Sea, Bumps follows Anita (Amanda Redman), a divorced sixty-two year old mother of two. Despite having an amicable relationship with ex-husband Howard (Philip Jackson), she has a poor relationship with her social-climbing sister Barbara (Louise Jameson) and her lazy children (Lisa McGrillis and Seb Cardinal), she sets upon herself to have a third child after hearing the news of an Indian woman having children in her seventies and finding out her daughter cannot have children. She successfully becomes pregnant, only to find out her daughter has become pregnant as well.

Cast

 Amanda Redman as Anita
 Lisa McGrillis as Joanna
 Seb Cardinal as Aiden
 Philip Jackson as Howard
 Louise Jameson as Barbara
 Lucy Montgomery as Fallon
 Rhys Thomas as Clay
 Freddie Davies as Roy
 Leila Hoffman as Nancy
Clarke Peters as Charles

Critical reception
Viewers of the sitcom reportedly "begged" the BBC to commission a series after finding it hilarious, according to Entertainment Daily. Michael Hogan of the Daily Telegraph said that it had an "intriguing enough premise" but just became a "nonsensical jumble". Despite saying that Redman's performance was "reliably excellent, whizzing about looking fabulous", he said Louise Jameson and Clarke Peters' characters were "underused".

References

External links

 official site at BBC

2020 British television series debuts
2020 television specials
2020s British sitcoms
BBC television sitcoms
English-language television shows
Television series about dysfunctional families
Television series about marriage
Television series about siblings